Johann-Mattis List (born 16 July 1981 in Kassel, Germany) is a German scientist. He is known for his work on quantitative comparative linguistics. List is currently professor at the University of Passau, Germany, where he leads the Chair of Multilingual Computational Linguistics.

Education
List graduated summa cum laude from Heinrich Heine University Düsseldorf in 2013. He completed his habilitation from the University of Jena in 2021, where he completed a dissertation titled Computer-Assisted Approaches to Historical Language Comparison.

Career
Throughout much of his research career, List has worked on projects such as Cross-Linguistic Linked Data (CLLD), Lexibank, and the Automated Similarity Judgment Program (ASJP). He has also co-authored various papers on computational language phylogeny, including on the Sino-Tibetan languages, and has introduced the concept of incomplete lineage sorting in historical linguistics.

References

External links

1981 births
Living people
Linguists from Germany
Max Planck Institute for Evolutionary Anthropology
Max Planck Institute for the Science of Human History
Computational linguistics researchers
Scientists from Kassel